The environmental effects of paint can vary depending on the type of paint used and mitigation measures. Traditional painting materials and processes can have harmful effects on the environment, including those from the use of lead and other additives.  Measures can be taken to reduce its environmental effects, including accurately estimating paint quantities so waste is minimized, and use of environmentally preferred paints, coating, painting accessories, and techniques.

The United States Environmental Protection Agency guidelines and Green Star  standards  can be applied.

Issues

Low-VOC and other environmentally preferred paints
Volatile organic compounds (VOCs) are gases emitted by various solids or liquids, many of which have short- and long-term adverse health effects. Solvents in traditional paints often contain high quantities of VOCs. Low VOC paints improve indoor air quality and reduce urban smog.  The beneficial characteristics of such paints include low odor, clean air, and safer technology, as well as excellent durability and a washable finish.

Low-VOC paint types include latex (water-based), recycled latex (water-based), acrylic, and milk paint.

The labels of paint cans can be checked for the following information:
 To be considered low-VOC, the paint should contain <50 g/L of VOC.
 To be considered zero-VOC, the paint should contain <5 g/L of VOC.
 Solid content usually ranges 25–45%; higher solid percentages indicate less VOCs.

In the US, items containing toxic ingredients have registration numbers with either the:
US Environmental Protection Agency (EPA)
Occupational Safety and Health Administration (OSHA)
United States Department of Transportation (DOT)

Antifouling paint

Antifouling paint (or bottom paint) is used to protect the hulls of boats from fouling by marine organisms. Antifouling paint protects the surface from corrosion and prevents drag on the ship from any build-up of marine organisms. These paints have contained organotin compounds such as tributyltin, which are considered to be toxic chemicals with negative effects on humans and the environment. Tributyltin compounds are moderately to highly persistent organic pollutants that bioconcentrate up the marine predators' food chain.  One common example is it leaching from marine paints into the aquatic environment, causing irreversible damage to the aquatic life. Tributyltin has also been linked to obesity in humans, as it triggers genes that cause the growth of fat cells.

Tributyltin is harmful to some marine organisms, including the dog whelk, it causes dog whelks to suffer from imposex; females develop male sexual characteristics such as a penis. This causes them to become infertile or even die. In severe cases, males can develop egg sacs.

Alternatives include biomimetic antifouling coatings.

Heavy metals
Heavy metals are used in paints and have raised concerns due to their toxicity at high levels of exposure and since they build up in the food chain.
Lead

Lead paint contains lead as pigment. Lead is also added to paint to speed drying, increase durability, retain a fresh appearance, and resist moisture that causes corrosion. Although banned in many countries, paint with significant lead content is still used in areas such as Eastern Europe and Asia, most commonly for industry purposes like anticorrosive paint.  For example, leaded paint is sometimes used to paint roadways and parking lot lines. Lead, a poisonous metal, can damage nerve connections (especially in young children) and cause blood and brain disorders. Because of lead's low reactivity and solubility, lead poisoning usually only occurs in cases when it is dispersed, such as when sanding lead-based paint prior to repainting.

Chromium
Primer paint containing hexavalent chromium is still widely used for aerospace and automobile refinishing applications. Zinc chromate has been used as a pigment for artists' paint, known as zinc yellow or yellow 36. It is highly toxic and now rarely used.

Mitigation
As a response to the environmental and health concerns, some paint manufacturers now offer environmentally friendly alternatives. Also, in some countries, paint recycling is carried out on surplus paints and resold.

See also
List of environmental issues
Lead-based paint in the United Kingdom
Lead-based paint in the United States

References

 
Pollution
Coatings
Paint